Isa or ISA may refer to:

Places
 Isa, Amur Oblast, Russia
 Isa, Kagoshima, Japan
 Isa, Nigeria
 Isa District, Kagoshima, former district in Japan
 Isa Town, middle class town located in Bahrain
 Mount Isa, Queensland, Australia
 Mount Isa Airport, IATA airport code "ISA"
 Isa (river), a river in Belarus

People
 Īsā, the name of Jesus in Islam
 Isa (name), an Arabic name corresponding to Jesus in English
 Isa, stage name of Lee Chae-young, member of K-Pop group STAYC
 Isa, female given name, short for Isabel or similar names beginning with Isa- such as Isadora
 Isa Tengblad (born 1998), Swedish singer using the mononym Isa

Arts, entertainment, and media

Fictional entities
 ISA (Days of Our Lives), spy agency in TV series
 Isa the iguana, in TV series Dora the Explorer
Interplanetary Strategic Alliance (ISA), military alliance in videogame saga Killzone

Other uses in arts, entertainment, and media
 Isa (album), a 2004 album by Enslaved
 Isa (film), a 2014 television film
 Isa, a dance in music of the Canary Islands

Computing
 Industry Standard Architecture, a PC computer bus standard
 Instruction set architecture, the specification for data types, registers, instructions, etc. for a given computer hardware architecture
 Is-a, a relationship between abstractions in programming
 Internet Security and Acceleration, a network router, firewall, antivirus program, VPN server and web cache from Microsoft Corporation
 Initialisation and Support Application, a real-time system which provides the soft functionality for the Node Support Computer of the ICL SX Node

Education
 Indian Squash Academy, Chennai, India
 Independent Schools Association (Australia), mainly for sports
 Independent Schools Association (UK), organisation for independent schools in the United Kingdom
 Iniciativa de Salud de las Americas, Spanish name for Health Initiative of the Americas
 Institute for the Study of the Americas, University of London, England
 Instituto Superior de Agronomia, an agronomy faculty in Lisbon, Portugal
 Instituto Superior de Arte, an art school in Havana, Cuba
 International School Amsterdam, the Netherlands
 International School Augsburg
 International School of Aleppo, Syria
 International School of Athens, Greece
 International School of the Americas, San Antonio, Texas
 International Studies Association
 Islamic Saudi Academy

Finance
 Income share agreement, a borrowing agreement sometimes used for tuition loans in the United States
 Individual savings account, class of retail investment arrangement available in the United Kingdom
 International Standards on Auditing, professional standards for the auditing of financial information.
 Israel Securities Authority, Israel's national securities regulator

Government
 Independent Safeguarding Authority, former UK child protection agency
 Intelligence Services Act 1994, UK
 Intelligence Support Activity, of the US Army
 Internal Security Agency, secret service and counter-espionage agency in Poland
 International Seabed Authority, for mineral-related activities
 International Searching Authority, for patents
 International Solar Alliance
 Interoperability Solutions for European Public Administrations, EU
 Invention Secrecy Act
 Iranian Space Agency
 Israel Security Agency or Shin Bet, Israel
 Israel Space Agency
 Israel State Archives, the national archive of Israel
 Italian Space Agency

Organizations and brands
 Industry Super Australia, the peak body for Industry superannuation funds in Australia
 Information Systems Associates FZE, an aviation software house
 Innovative Software Applications, a company taken over by Sorcim in 1982
 International Federation of the National Standardizing Associations
 International Seabed Authority
 International Socialist Alternative, an international association of Trotskyist political parties.
 International Society of Arboriculture, a non-profit botanical organization
 International Society of Automation, a non-profit professional organization for engineers, technicians, and students
 International Sociological Association
 International Soling Association
 International Surfing Association, the world governing authority for the sport of surfing
 Irish Sailing Association, the governing body for sailing in Ireland
 International Slackline Association

Science
 Isosaccharinic acid, a six-carbon sugar acid
 Intrinsic sympatheticomimetic activity, a term used with beta blockers that are partial agonists
 Infectious salmon anemia, a viral disease of salmon
 International Standard Atmosphere, an atmospheric model of the Earth
 International Seismological Association, former name of the International Association of Seismology and Physics of the Earth's Interior (IASPEI)

Entomology
 Isa (moth), a genera of moths.

Other uses
 Intelligent speed adaptation, systems to automatically enforce vehicle speed limits
 International Symbol of Access, blue and white wheelchair symbol
 ISA Brown, type of chicken
 Ideological state apparatus, a theory by Louis Althusser

See also 
 Internal Security Act (disambiguation)
 Isaz, the "I" rune in the Scandinavian runic alphabet
 Issa (disambiguation)
 Isha (disambiguation)